F.C. Bnei Arraba is an Israeli football club based in Arraba. The club is currently plays in Liga Gimel Lower Galilee division.

History
The club was established in 2009 and joined Liga Gimel, where it played until the end of the 2010–11 season, when the club finished second in the Upper Galilee division. The club lost a promotion play-off match against Maccabi Ein Mahil , but was promoted during the summer after Ironi Sayid Umm al-Fahm folded.

The club achieved its best position in Liga Bet in the 2012–13 season, placing fifth and reaching the promotion play-offs, in which the club had beaten Ihud Bnei Majd al-Krum in the first round, but lost in the divisional final to Hapoel Kaukab. The following season, however, the club finished bottom of the league and dropped back to Liga Gimel.

See also
Sports in Israel

References

External links
F.C. Bnei Arraba The Israel Football Association 

Football clubs in Israel
Hapoel football clubs